The Rahway Valley Railroad (RVRR) was a short-line railroad in the Northeastern United States which connected the Lehigh Valley Railroad in Roselle Park and the Central Railroad of New Jersey in Cranford with the Delaware, Lackawanna & Western in Summit. Operating over a span of 95 years (1897–1992) in Union County, New Jersey, in its prime it was one of the most successful shortline railroads in U.S. history, turning a profit during the Great Depression. During its lifetime, the RVRR was instrumental in the development of Kenilworth (site of its headquarters) as well as Union Township, Springfield and other towns along its route. Later years saw traffic decline; in 1986 the line could not secure liability insurance. The railroad was sold to the Delaware Otsego Corporation which did little to revitalize the nearly 90-year-old line. Traffic continued to decline until service ended in 1992, with a single customer remaining.

Rail trail on the Rahway Valley Railroad main line

Area residents have proposed a 7.3-mile pedestrian linear park along the main line of the abandoned Rahway Valley Railroad.  The rail trail would run eastbound from Overlook Medical Center on the edge of downtown Summit  and head south along the old railbed through  Springfield,  Union, Kenilworth and ending at the southwest edge of Roselle Park at the Cranford border.  A northern portion of the rail trail on the RVRR main line is under construction as the Summit Park Line, with a footbridge over Morris Avenue installed in October 2022. In parallel, advocates have been pushing for immediate development of the portion south of Route 22, running past the Galloping Hill Golf Course through Kenilworth and Roselle Park. The New Jersey Department of Transportion, which owns the railbed, has been working to clear it in anticipation of possible future trail use.

History

New York & New Orange Railroad 1897–1901
The New York & New Orange Railroad was incorporated on May 6, 1897 by the promoters of the New Orange Industrial Association. The organization had been formed in 1894 by several Elmira, New York businessmen in order to develop a swath of land on the border of Cranford and Union to be known as New Orange (now Kenilworth). The Elmirans envisioned an ideal manufacturing town with many amenities. The railroad was formed to serve the town's residents and factories.

The initial stretch between Aldene and New Orange was surveyed in Summer 1897 by J. Wallace Higgins and Anthony Grippo. Contractor Frank H. Bailey, of Elmira, constructed the two-mile stretch between July 1897 and March 1898. Connection was made with the Central Railroad of New Jersey (CNJ) in October 1897. An extension was made to N. 19th Street in New Orange during Winter 1898-9. The half-mile long Lehigh Valley Branch was constructed, to make connection with the Lehigh Valley Railroad (LV), in early 1899. The railroad's first locomotive, No. 1 (named "New Orange"), was acquired in July 1899. The CNJ operated the railroad until it was formally opened for passenger traffic on August 1, 1899. A second locomotive, No. 2 (named "Baltusrol") was acquired in September 1900.

The town of New Orange proved to be less successful than its promoters had hoped. The NY&NO fell into default and was sold under foreclosure on February 16, 1901 to the hastily organized New Orange Four Junction Railroad.

New Orange Four Junction Railroad  1901–1905
The New Orange Four Junction Railroad (NOFJ) was incorporated on February 4, 1901 by several of the New Orange promoters to take over the NY&NO, which fell into foreclosure. It took over operations of the railroad on February 16. William W. Cole, one of the Elmira men, took charge of the enterprise as President and General Manager. Day-to-day operations were carried out by Horatio F. Dankel, the railroad's Superintendent. Extensions of the railroad were continually contemplated, to Irvington, New Jersey, Millburn, New Jersey, and Summit, New Jersey. Several surveys were made, and some work was done in acquiring right-of-ways, but the NOFJ was unable to extend its route. 

In October 1902, the Pennsylvania Railroad purchased Tin Kettle and Press hills in New Orange for the purposes of excavating them for fill material, to be used in filling Greenville Yard in Jersey City, Waverly Yard in Newark, and the approach to the North River Tunnels. The NOFJ hauled hundreds of carloads of fill material between the excavation sites in New Orange to the junction with the Lehigh Valley Railroad.

In 1904, the New Orange Industrial Association failed. The remaining promoters engaged several New York City businessmen and reorganized the enterprise as the Kenilworth Realty Corporation. These men partnered with Louis Keller, founder of the Social Register and the Baltusrol Golf Club, to form the Rahway Valley Railroad and construct an extension of the NOFJ to Summit. The two railroads were consolidated on March 1, 1905.

Rahway Valley Railroad 1904–1986

Louis Keller, the founder and owner of the Baltusrol Golf Club, was dissatisfied with the transportation to his golf club over the rough dirt roads that existed in Union County, New Jersey in the early 1900s. His desire for better transportation to the club was frustrated by the New Orange Industrial Association, as their efforts to extend their railroad to Summit came to grief. Keller became involved with the New Orange syndicate in the Cross Country Railroad project but it went nowhere. After the association failed, and was reorganized as the Kenilworth Realty Corporation, Keller partnered with its new principals to form the Rahway Valley Railroad on July 18, 1904. The NOFJ and the new RV were consolidated on March 1, 1905.

The railroad was opened to Springfield on May 25, 1905, to Baltusrol on January 1, 1906, and to Summit on August 2, 1906. After completion of the bridge across Broad Street, the RV made application to the Delaware, Lackawanna & Western Railroad for a connection at Summit. The DL&W objected to the link and court battles ensued, eventually rising to the level of the United States Supreme Court, but a connection was not made until March 1930.

The RV incurred a large sum of debt in its construction and without its desired DL&W connection, and a lack of lineside industry, the railroad had no hope to pay off its indebtedness. The railroad obtained a substantial mortgage, secured by bonds owned by the Elmira interests. A call feature on this bond issue became active in 1909 which effectively reverted control of the railroad to the Elmirans. To circumvent this, Keller organized an operating company, the Rahway Valley Company, Lessee, to lease and operate the Rahway Valley Railroad Company. After the Elmirans died, their respective estates looked to liquidate their bond holdings and wished to sell the railroad. Keller eventually acquired the mortgage bonds, supplementing his status as the railroad's majority shareholder. The Keller family maintained a majority ownership of the railroad through 1986.

In 1914, when World War I started, the RV experienced a boom in traffic. A munitions plant was built by the American Can Co. in 1915 on the Rahway River Branch in Kenilworth. A gunpowder plant, Wright Chemical Co., was operated in Union, just north of present day Route 22. An explosion at the Wright plant caused widespread damage in the area and rumors of German spies prompted the railroad to hire armed guards to protect the property from foreign infiltrators. The Can Co. provided a string of coaches that came from Staten Island, via the Staten Island Rapid Transit line, every morning loaded with workers. The Lehigh Valley ran trains up to Kenilworth for a time to bring in workers and the CNJ dropped off as many as five thousand arsenal workers a day for three shifts. At its peak, the RV carried thousands of workers to the factories around the clock.

After the war ended, freight traffic dropped off substantially and passenger service all but evaporated, greatly compromising the railroad's financial position. A tumult in the railroad's managerial staff ended with Roger A. Clark becoming General Manager in 1920. Through Clark's efforts, and that of his son, George, the railroad's fortunes began to change. Louis Keller died in 1922 and his estate made Roger Clark president. Clark abolished the last vestiges of the railroad's passenger service and began to replace the deteriorated locomotive roster. Nos. 9 and 10 were traded in to General Equipment Co. for No. 11, a 2-6-0 "Mogul"-type, in 1922. No. 12 was purchased in 1927 but was deemed too large for continued operation over the railroad and was retired a year later. It was not until 1928, when Nos. 13 and 14 were purchased, that the RV had an adequate locomotive roster.

Roger Clark died in 1932 and the Keller estate appointed his son George A. Clark as president. Under George Clark the Rahway Valley Railroad made its first net profit in many years in 1934. Clark also continued to attract new businesses to locate on the line. An increase in larger industry along the railroad also occurred. But by the early 1950s with the development of improved highways, trucks began chipping away at the Rahway Valley's business market.

Clark began to dieselize the railroad in 1951 with the purchase of 70-ton locomotive No. 16 from General Electric. For a few years the Rahway Valley used both steam (#13 & 15) and diesel (#16) power until a second diesel locomotive (#17) was purchased in 1954. No.13 was scrapped and No.15 was put into storage in Kenilworth until it was sold to Steamtown in 1959.

George A. Clark died in his office in the old Kenilworth Station in 1969. His son Robert G. Clark was appointed president. By this time traffic on the Rahway Valley Railroad had again decreased significantly. With smaller profits came deferred track maintenance and weeds could be seen growing along the line. In the early 1970s came the closing of the line in Maplewood. Bob Clark attempted to attract new business to the line, and was temporarily successful, but his customer base continued to be siphoned away by trucks. He unexpectedly died in 1975.

The Keller estate, still owners of the railroad, appointed experienced railroader Benard Cahill to the presidency. Cahill was able to bring new life to the railroad. He secured grants from the state to update trackage and secured new office space in a former Lehigh Valley passenger coach that he purchased and parked on a siding in Kenilworth (the previous offices in the old Kenilworth Station having burned in 1974).

In 1980 passenger trains were again run over the Rahway Valley Railroad, albeit for just a week, for the occasion of the U.S. Open being held at the Baltusrol Golf Club. Trains were run between Kenilworth and Baltusrol in a push-pull formation by Nos. 16 & 17. The train, sponsored by the Union County Trust Company, used passenger coaches rented from the Cooperstown & Charlotte Valley Railroad in New York.

Despite improvements and revitalization, the formation of Conrail in 1976 put the Rahway Valley Railroad in an awkward situation. Previously having three independent railroads connecting to it, the RVRR now had one railroad connecting to it in three separate places. As a result of the formation of Conrail, the last train ran to Summit in 1976. No longer using the Summit connection, the RVRR increasingly used the former Lehigh Valley connection and less and less used the former CNJ connection at Aldene. But despite these new predicaments the RVRR under Cahill kept trudging along, increasingly relying on its largest customer, Monsanto Corp. in Kenilworth, as slowly more smaller customers switched to trucks.

Delaware Otsego Corporation 1986–1992

In 1986, the Rahway Valley Railroad was unable to purchase liability insurance. The line was in turn sold to the Delaware Otsego Corporation (DO), which operates the New York, Sushquehanna, and Western. Nos. 16 & 17 were removed from the line in 1989, and put into service in Binghamton, NY. The replacement No. 120 of the NYS&W, an EMD SW9 built by EMD.

The DO did little to revitalize the line. The DO deferred track maintenance and customers became disenchanted with the lines new management and turned to trucks. The DO, also operators of the former Staten Island Rapid Transit Line from Cranford to Linden, began using the Aldene connection which had received less maintenance in years past, so derailments were frequent. In 1988, the now-unused former Lehigh Valley connection was removed. Monsanto Corp. closed and Jaeger Lumber discontinued service in 1991. With virtually no business left to serve the Delaware Otsego Corp. closed the Rahway Valley Railroad along with the Staten Island Rapid Transit line in April 1992, the RVRR having only one customer left.

Current status 

The Morristown and Erie Railway (M&E) was contracted by the state of New Jersey in 2001 to refurbish and operate the southern portion of the former Rahway Valley Railroad. M&E operations on the southern portion of the former Rahway Valley Railroad commenced in July 2005 and connect to the newly restored Staten Island Railway on Staten Island, New York, and the national rail network via an interchange with Conrail Shared Assets in Cranford.

As of 2010, the funding for the Rahway Valley rebuild by NJDOT are not enough to keep rebuilding. Now most of the line from Roselle Park-Union/Springfield border is cleared of trees and thick brush. New track has been inserted from the Union/Springfield border to the Union Wye (behind Rahway Avenue). All the sidings to the railway's potential future customers were left unconnected to the main line. Also track has been inserted in some parts of Kenilworth. As for the sections past the Union/Springfield border, nothing has been done yet through the towns of Springfield or Summit.

As of May 15, 2012, M&E removed all its assets from the railbeds since they did not exercise their option to extend the operating agreement with Union County.

Rahway Valley locomotive roster

Accidents on the NY&NO and the RVRR 
 September 1, 1899 — at 1:10 p.m., a Mr. Theo Harrison of Newark, New Jersey, was driving his horse-drawn wagon on Westfield Avenue when he tried to outrun the oncoming NY&NO locomotive No. 1. Mr. Harrison was thrown from the wagon and sustained a minor flesh wound on the right leg from a broken crosstie. He was later reported to be partially paralyzed.
 May 11, 1904 — William H. Harding, a conductor on the New Orange Junction Four Railroad (NY&NO), was fatally injured while coupling cars and died May 13. The accident was a result of carelessness on the part of Mr. Harding.
 March 24, 1906 — James Gray, an engineer on the Rahway Valley Railroad, lost a foot when locomotive No. 3 was struck by a coal hopper that had broken loose and ran downhill. The locomotive was scrapped after the accident.

External links 

 The History of the RVRR
 The Rahway Valley Railroad
 New Jersey's Streak o' Rust|Trains Magazine Article of October, 1950: By John T. Cunningham
  Rahway Valley Railroad Historical Society
 Archived news articles on the progress of RVRR reactivation
 Great photo gallery 
 VERY detailed engine roster
 Union County benefits of the RVRR
 Morristown & Erie reactivation details
 RVRR forum
 Early history of the RVRR

References

Defunct New Jersey railroads
Transportation in Union County, New Jersey
Rahway River